Radezolid (INN, codenamed RX-1741) is a novel oxazolidinone antibiotic being developed by Melinta Therapeutics, Inc. for the treatment of bacterial acne.

References

Further reading
 
 
 
 
 
 

Oxazolidinone antibiotics
Triazoles
Fluoroarenes
Acetamides
Biphenyls